The  is a Class 1 river flowing through Gifu and Aichi prefectures in Japan. In Gifu Prefecture, it is also referred to as the Toki River (土岐川 Toki-gawa); around the city of Kasugai in Aichi Prefecture, it is referred to as the Tamano River (玉野川 Tamano-gawa). Fujimae-higata (designated sites as List of Ramsar wetlands of international importance) exists in the River mouth.

Geography
The river originates at Mount Yūdachi in Ena, Gifu Prefecture. After flowing through the Tamano Valley in Aichi Prefecture, it enters the Nōbi Plain, before emptying into Ise Bay through Nagoya's Minato-ku.

River communities
The river passes through or forms the boundary of the communities listed below.

Gifu Prefecture
Ena, Mizunami, Toki, Tajimi
Aichi Prefecture
Seto, Kasugai, Nagoya, Kiyosu, Jimokuji, Ōharu

References

External links

Shōnai River Office (Ministry of Land, Infrastructure and Transport) 
 (mouth)

Geography of Nagoya
Rivers of Aichi Prefecture
Rivers of Gifu Prefecture
Rivers of Japan